Indénié-Djuablin Region is one of the 31 regions of Ivory Coast. Since its establishment in 2011, it has been one of two regions in Comoé District. The region's seat is Abengourou. Other important towns are Agnibilekrou, Bettié and Niablé. The region's area is 6910 km², and at the 2021 census, it had a population of 716,443.

History
As part of the 2011 administrative reorganization of the subdivisions of Ivory Coast, the first-level Moyen-Comoé Region was converted into the second-level Indénié-Djuablin Region, with no change in territory.

Departments
Indénié-Djuablin is currently divided into three departments: Abengourou, Agnibilékrou, and Bettié.

Notes

 
Regions of Comoé District
2011 establishments in Ivory Coast
States and territories established in 2011